Justo Albarracín (born 18 May 1951) is an Argentine equestrian. He competed at the 1984 Summer Olympics and the 1996 Summer Olympics.

References

External links

1951 births
Living people
Argentine male equestrians
Olympic equestrians of Argentina
Equestrians at the 1984 Summer Olympics
Equestrians at the 1996 Summer Olympics
Place of birth missing (living people)